Abbas Merdasi (born December 22, 1982) is an Iranian footballer who plays for Sanat Naft Abadan F.C. in the Iran Pro League.

Club career
In 2009, Merdasi joined Sanat Naft Abadan F.C. after spending the previous season at Pars Bushehr in the Azadegan League.

Assists

References

Living people
Shahin Bushehr F.C. players
Sanat Naft Abadan F.C. players
Shirin Faraz Kermanshah players
Persian Gulf Pro League players
Azadegan League players
Iranian footballers
1982 births
Association football midfielders
Association football fullbacks
21st-century Iranian people